Mount Ephraim, or alternatively Mount of Ephraim, was the historical name for the central mountainous district of Israel once occupied by the Tribe of Ephraim, extending from Bethel to the plain of Jezreel. In Joshua's time, approximately sometime between the 18th century BCE and the 13th century BCE, these hills were densely wooded.

Later, the region became known as Samaria, after the capital city of the northern Kingdom of Israel which was centered in the area.

Notable persons 
Joshua was buried at Timnath-heres among the mountains of Ephraim, on the north side of the hill of Gaash. This region is also called the "mountains of Israel" and the "mountains of Samaria".

Israel's fourth judge and prophetess Deborah lived in this region. Her home was called "the palm tree of Deborah", and was between Bethel and Ramah in Benjamin.

'Then Jeroboam built Shechem in mount Ephraim, and dwelt therein; and went out from thence, and built Penuel. And Jeroboam said in his heart, Now shall the kingdom return to the house of David:(Ephraim was the new king after the pass of the King of Solomon.)

See also
 Jeremiah 4

References

Ephraim
Hebrew Bible regions